Eohypsibiidae is a family of water bear or moss piglet, tardigrades in the class Eutardigrada. It contains the following species in three genera:

 Austeruseus 
 Austeruseus balduri 
 Austeruseus faroensis 
 Austeruseus rokuri 

 Bertolanius 
 Bertolanius birnae 
 Bertolanius mahunkai 
 Bertolanius markevichi 
 Bertolanius nebulosus 
 Bertolanius portucalensis 
 Bertolanius smreczinskii 
 Bertolanius volubilis 
 Bertolanius weglarskae 

 Eohypsibius
 Eohypsibius nadjae 
 Eohypsibius terrestris

References

External links

Parachela (tardigrade)
Tardigrade families
Polyextremophiles